In November 2002, two medium-sized earthquakes struck northern Pakistan, causing major damage in Baltistan region and killing 41 people.

Tectonic setting
Pakistan is directly influenced by the ongoing oblique convergence between the Indian Plate and Eurasian Plate. Along the northern margin of the India-Eurasia convergent boundary is the Main Himalayan Thrust which accommodates north–south continental collision. Thrust faulting in the Hindu Kush and Himalaya region is the direct result of the plate interaction. In the Balochistan region, the convergence is highly oblique, involving the large Chaman Fault; a left-lateral strike-slip structure. While a large portion of the boundary is accommodated by strike-slip faulting, the region also hosts the Sulaiman fold and thrust belt. Large thrust earthquakes including the 1934 Nepal–India earthquake were the direct result of the plate interaction. The 2005 Kashmir earthquake occurred near the vicinity of the Main Himalayan Thrust.

Impact
41 people were killed during the two tremors, including a family of seven who all died when their house collapsed, and many others were injured in Diamer District. The number of people rendered homeless was estimated to be about 15,000, and the number of houses damaged was estimated to be 2,756, with a hundred houses destroyed. More than 2,000 people were evacuated from their homes due to the earthquakes. The first tremor killed 17 and injured 65 others, while the second, much stronger earthquake killed 23, including 18 children, with a hundred others injured.

The Karakoram Highway was damaged by landslides which killed hundreds of livestock but soon re-opened for light traffic. Efforts were being made to clear it for heavy traffic but landslides persisted due to the tremors. However one person died and three were injured when an aftershock triggered another landslide on the highway.

See also
List of earthquakes in 2002
List of earthquakes in Pakistan

References

2002 disasters in Pakistan
2002 earthquakes
Earthquakes in Pakistan
2002 in Pakistan
Earthquakes in Asia